The Nukha uezd was a county (uezd) of the Elizavetpol Governorate of the Russian Empire and later of the Azerbaijan Democratic Republic with its center in Nukha (present-day Shaki) from 1868 until its formal abolition in 1921 by the Soviet authorities of the Azerbaijan SSR.

Geography
The Nukha uezd was located in the far northeastern part of the Elizavetpol Governorate, bordering the Dagestan Oblast to the north, the Baku Governorate to the east, the Zakatal Okrug to the west, and the Aresh uezd to the south. The administrative center of the Nukha uezd was the city of Nukha. The northern part of the county was largely mountainous and laid along the Greater Caucasus mountain range, where the altitude reaches as high as 14-15 thousand feet in altitude. The notable peaks of the district included Mount Bazardüzü (14,722 ft) and Tkhfan Dag (13,764 ft) whose valleys were enriched with many rivers. The southern part of the region possessed the best conditions for agricultural use including gardening, harvesting rice and sericulture. The main rivers in the Nukha uezd were Shin-chay, Kish-chay, Ajighan-chay, Turyanchay, Goychay which were used for irrigation purposes.

History
After the establishment of Russian rule over the khanates in the South Caucasus and the implementation of administrative reforms, the territories of the erstwhile Shaki Khanate were incorporated into Shamakhi Governorate of the Russian Empire, later ebing renamed to the Baku Governorate. Upon establishment of the Elizavetpol Governorate in 1868, the Nukha uezd was transferred from the Baku to Elizavetpol Governorates. In 1874, the southern section of Nukha uezd was separated to form the Aresh uezd within the same governorate. On 30 August 1918, the Elizavetpol Governorate was officially renamed to the Ganja Governorate in an effort by the authorities of the Azerbaijan Democratic Republic to de-Russify the region of its Tsarist toponyms.

Administrative divisions 
The subcounties (uchastoks) of the Nukha uezd in 1912 were as follows:

Economy 
The population was engaged primarily in agricultural farming, gardening, sericulture, tobacco growing. At the end of the 19th century, Nukha uezd was making up about 95% of tobacco production of Elizavetpol Governorate.

Demographics

Russian Empire Census 
The majority of the population indicated Tatar to be their mother tongue, with significant Armenian, Kyurin, and Udi speaking minorities.

Kavkazskiy kalendar 
The statistics indicated the district to be overwhelmingly Sunni Muslim with sizeable Armenian, Asiatic Christian and Shia Muslim minorities:

Notes

References

Bibliography 

Geographic history of Azerbaijan
States and territories established in 1868
1921 disestablishments
Uezds of Elizavetpol Governorate
Uezds of the Soviet Union